Necrobotics is the practice of using biotic materials (or dead organisms) as robotic components. In July 2022, researchers in the Preston Innovation Lab at Rice University in Houston, Texas published a paper in Advanced Science introducing the concept and demonstrating its capability by repurposing dead spiders as robotic grippers and applying pressurized air to activate their gripping arms.

See also 
 3D bioprinting
 Biomedical engineering
 Blood substitute
 Remote control animal
 Soft robotics
 Zombie#Theoretical academic studies

References 

Robotics
Undead
Biorobotics